Ebb or EBB may refer to:

People 
 Elizabeth Barrett Browning (1806–1861), English poet
 Fred Ebb (1928–2004), American lyricist
 Karl Ebb (1896–1988), Finnish athlete and racing driver
 Kimberley Ebb (born 1987), Australian rules footballer

Other uses 
 Ebb (spacecraft), one of the spacecraft of the Gravity Recovery and Interior Laboratory
 Ebb tide
 Ebbw Vale Town railway station, in Wales
 IATA airport code for Entebbe International Airport, in Uganda
 École Belge de Bujumbura, a Belgian international school in Bujumbura, Burundi
 Ebbs, Tyrol, Austria

See also 
 Ebb and flow